Bion 11 was a Russian biological research satellite that was part of the Bion programme. Scientists from France, Russia and United States conducted the experiments. Bion 11 was launched from the Plesetsk Cosmodrome aboard a Soyuz-U launch vehicle. It carried two monkeys named Lalik and Multik. The spacecraft type was based on the Zenit reconnaissance satellite and launches of Bion satellites began in 1973 with primary emphasis on the problems of radiation effects on human beings. Launches in the program included Kosmos 110, 605, 670, 782, plus Nauka modules flown on Zenit-2M reconnaissance satellites. 90 kg of equipment could be contained in the external Nauka module.

Mission 
It carried newts, snails, Drosophila flies and other insects, bacteria, and two macaque monkeys (Macaca mulatta), Lapik and Multik. Both monkeys were safe at landing but Multik died of a heart attack during medical tests under general anaesthetic on 8 January 1997.

The Magee-8 scientific equipment was designed to study the basic features of electrostatic modular protection system. Other equipment was used to maintain the temperature and humidity within the specified range, the atmospheric regeneration, physiological parameters of the monkeys were recorded and transferred them to the ground in TV picture.

Bion 12 
A similar mission "Bion-12" was scheduled for December 1998 but did not take place due to cessation of participation of the United States.

See also 

 1996 in spaceflight
 Animals in space

References

External links 
 Bion Experiment Profile, Payload profile: Bion 11

Bion satellites
Kosmos satellites
Spacecraft launched in 1996
1996 in spaceflight
1996 in Russia